Regina Kastberg Hansen Willman (October 5, 1914 – October 28, 1965) was an American composer, born in Burns, Wyoming. She married Allan Arthur Willman in 1942; they divorced in 1956, but remained close throughout her life. Willman received a B.M. from the University of Wyoming in 1945, and a M.M. from the University of New Mexico in 1961. She studied with Darius Milhaud at Mills College, Roy Harris at Colorado College, and pursued further studies at the University of California, Berkeley, the Juilliard School, the Sorbonne, and the Lausanne Conservatory. Willman was the resident composer of the Helene Wurlitzer Foundation in Taos, New Mexico, from 1956–57 and 1960-61. Her papers are archived at the University of Wyoming.

Works
Regina Willman's compositions include:

Ballet
Doves (piano)
Legend of the Willow Plate (1949; chamber orchestra)

Orchestra 
Anchorage Symphony
Design for Orchestra 1 (1948)
Design for Orchestra 2 (1953)

Piano 
Little Tailor Suite
Steel Mill (1941; two pianos)
Three Compositions for Piano

Theatre 
Music for Medea (text by Euripides)

Vocal 
Ante Vero Longam (1961; tenor solo, men's chorus, oboe, and piano; text by Lambertus)
Apres le Deluge (1961; high voice and piano; text by Arthur Rimbaud)
First Holy Sonnet (voice and string trio; text by John Donne)
O Sleep Now (1956; medium voice and piano)
Vocalise (voices and low strings)

References 

American women composers
1914 births
1965 deaths
University of Wyoming alumni
University of New Mexico alumni
Lausanne Conservatory alumni
People from Wyoming